The Robert B. and Estelle J. Webb House is located in Florence, Wisconsin.

History
Robert was involved in mining and ran a hardware store in Florence. The house was added to the State Register of Historic Places in 2013 and to the National Register of Historic Places the following year.

References

Houses on the National Register of Historic Places in Wisconsin
National Register of Historic Places in Florence County, Wisconsin
Queen Anne architecture in Wisconsin
Houses completed in 1883